Protomap may refer to:

 Protomap (neuroscience) - a hypothetical map of the ventricular zone in the brain
 Protomap (proteomics) - a proteomic technique for characterizing proteolytic events using mass spectrometry